Darren Barbier (born December 19, 1960) is a former American football coach. He served as the head football at Nicholls State University from 1995 to 1998, compiling a record of 17–28.

Playing career
Barbier is a former baseball player at Nicholls State University.

Coaching career

High School career
Barbier began his coaching career as an assistant at his alma mater, Archbishop Shaw High School in Marrero, Louisiana from 1983 to 1988. His first head coaching position was at Hahnville High School in Boutte, Louisiana from 1989 to 1994 where he won two LHSAA state championships in 1992 and 1994. In 2000, Barbier returned to the high school coaching ranks as head football coach at De La Salle High School in New Orleans; a position he held through the 2002 season.

College career
Barbier served as the head football coach at Nicholls State University from 1995 to 1998, compiling a record of 17 wins and 28 losses. Barbier was given the Eddie Robinson Award in 1996 as the top coach in NCAA Division I-AA football when he guided the Colonels to an 8–4 record and a berth in the NCAA Division I-AA playoffs, where his team lost their first-round game. The 1996 turnaround came one season after Nicholls State finished 0–11 and in last place in the Southland Conference.

In 1999, Barbier served as defensive backs coach at Tulane University.

Head coaching record

College

References

1960 births
Living people
Nicholls Colonels baseball players
Nicholls Colonels football coaches
Tulane Green Wave football coaches
Archbishop Shaw High School alumni
High school football coaches in Louisiana
People from Jefferson Parish, Louisiana
People from Luling, Louisiana
Baseball players from New Orleans
Coaches of American football from Louisiana
Players of American football from New Orleans